Xiakou is a town under the administration of Fucheng County, Hebei, China. , it has 56 villages under its administration.

References 

Township-level divisions of Hebei
Fucheng County